Anthomyiopsis nigrisquamata is a European species of fly in the family Tachinidae.

References

Tachininae
Muscomorph flies of Europe
Insects described in 1838